Inceptisols are a soil order in USDA soil taxonomy. They form quickly through alteration of parent material. They are more developed than Entisols. They have no accumulation of clays, iron oxide, aluminium oxide or organic matter. They have an ochric or umbric horizon and a cambic subsurface horizon.

In the World Reference Base for Soil Resources (WRB), most Inceptisols are Cambisols or Umbrisols. Some may be Nitisols. Many Aquepts belong to Gleysols and Stagnosols.

Suborders

Aquepts – with a water table close to the surface
Gelepts – in very cold climates
Cryepts – in cold climates
Udepts – in humid climates
Ustepts – in semiarid and sub-humid climates'
Xerepts – in areas with very dry summers and moist winters

References 

 
 
 

United States Department of Agriculture
Pedology
Types of soil